Metarctia rufescens is a moth of the subfamily Arctiinae. It was described by Francis Walker in 1855. It is found in Burundi, the Republic of the Congo, the Democratic Republic of the Congo, Gabon, Kenya, Mozambique, Rwanda, South Africa, Tanzania and Zambia.

References

 

Metarctia
Moths described in 1855
Moths of Sub-Saharan Africa